The Austro-Hungarian concession of Tianjin (German: österreichisch-ungarische Konzession, Hungarian: osztrák – magyar Tiencsini koncesszió) was a territory (concession) in the Chinese city of Tientsin occupied colonially by Austria-Hungary between 1902 and 1920. It had been obtained by Austria-Hungary after the signing of the Boxer Protocol at the conclusion of the conflict between China and the Alliance of Eight Nations, which had sent an international expeditionary force to quell the Boxer Rebellion of 1901. Although the Austro-Hungarian occupation corps had been present from the previous year, the concession formally began on December 27, 1902. It is the shortest lived concession, having existed for only 14 years.

History 
The Austro-Hungarian concession, with an extension of 108 hectares, was one of the minor concessions made by the Qing Dynasty to the victorious powers. This was due to the limited Austro-Hungarian participation in the international expeditionary force: four cruisers and 296 soldiers. The concession borders the Hai River in the west, across the bridge from Tianjin City, to the Jingshan Railway in the east, and Jinzhong River (now Shizilin Street, Hebei District), a tributary of the Haihe River to the north. Across the river is a century-old French building, Old Cathedral of Our Lady of Victories, in Hebei District. It is adjacent to Tianjin Italian Concession, which is also located in Hebei District.

Contrary to what was done by the other European powers, Austria-Hungary granted citizenship to all the local populations. The administration was entrusted to a council made up of local nobles, the imperial consul and the commander of the military garrison which included 40 sailors from the Austro-Hungarian Navy and 70 Chinese policemen called Shimbo. The two Austro-Hungarian representatives had the majority right in the council meetings. The juridical law applied in court was the Austro-Hungarian one.

In the concession were built a theater, spa, school, pawnshop, barracks, prison, hospital and cemetery. The relatively short presence, about 14 years, left traces of the Habsburg style still found today in that area of the city.

With the First World War, China entered the war alongside the Triple Entente against the Central Powers and immediately occupied the Austro-Hungarian and German concessions, declaring them revoked on August 14, 1917.

At the end of the world conflict, with the dissolution of Austria-Hungary, two separate treaties were necessary to ratify the revocation. Austria renounced the rights on the concession on 10 September 1919 with the Treaty of Saint-Germain-en-Laye, Hungary renounced them on 4 June 1920 with the Treaty of Trianon. In June 1927, the concession was incorporated into the Italian concession following a series of clashes between opposing Chinese factions.

Development 
The Austria-Hungarian Empire’s trade with China itself was extremely limited, and the concession was located at the northernmost end of the Haihe River, which was not conducive to shipping. Therefore, the concession was not an important financial and trading area. However, the Austrian Concession was located between the old city and the Tianjin Railway Station. Soon after the concession was delimited, the Belgian Shichang Tram and Electric Company constructed a tram line from the east gate of the old city to the railway station, and at the same time rebuilt the east pontoon bridge into an iron bridge. Named Jintang Bridge (now Jintang Bridge in Hebei District), a commercial street with concentrated Chinese retail businesses was formed along the main road (now Jianguo Road in Hebei District) where trams passed.

Gallery

List of consuls 

 Carl Bernauer (1901–1908)
 Erwin Ritter von Zach (1908)
 Miloslav Kobr (1908–1912)
 Hugo Schumpeter (1913–1917)

See also 

 Foreign concessions in Tianjin
 Concessions in China
 Map of concessions in Tianjin

References 

Concessions in China
Former Austrian colonies
20th century in Tianjin
History of Tianjin
Former colonies in Asia
European colonisation in Asia
History of Austria-Hungary